Zaborze  (German Schulzendorf) is a settlement in the administrative district of Gmina Gryfino, within Gryfino County, West Pomeranian Voivodeship, in north-western Poland, close to the German border.

References

Zaborze